SPEB may refer to:
 Society for the Protection of the European Bison
 Agmatinase, an enzyme